The 2008–2009 Vendée Globe is a non-stop solo Round the World Yacht Race for IMOCA 60 class yachts this is the sixth edition of the race.

Summary
The 2008 Vendée Globe began on 9 November 2008 and was won by Michel Desjoyaux, who set a new record at 84d 3h 9' 8".

Race Director for this edition was Denis Horeau who heads the event management team having done the role for the 1989 and 2004 editions.

Incidents

Retirement causes
The problems encountered by Jean Le Cam—losing his keel bulb and capsizing in the Southern Ocean—had a major impact on the order of finish. Fellow competitor Vincent Riou diverted and found his boat, circling to try to toss a rope to Le Cam who had exited a security hatch to hang onto the rudder. After three failed attempts, Vincent Riou went in closer, managing to rescue Jean Le Cam but also damaging his mast which failed soon after. Riou retired, but was awarded third place on redress, as he was third when diverted to assist the boat in distress. In addition Armel Le Cléac’h was awarded 11 hours, Sam Davies 32 hours and Marc Guillemot 82 hours for diverting to aid in the rescue

Results

Gallery

Entries

Participants gallery

Participant facts equipment
Thirty skippers started the race a qualification passage was required to validate the registration of each boat, this course could have been carried out as part of another sailing race.

References

External links
 
 Official YouTube Channel
 

Vendée Globe
Vendée Globe
Vendée Globe
Vendée Globe
Vendée Globe